Tetramesityldiiron is an organoiron compound with the formula Fe2(C6H2(CH3)3)4. It is a red, air-sensitive solid that is used as a precursor to other iron complexes. It adopts a centrosymmetric structure. The complex is a Lewis acid, forming monomeric adducts, e.g. Fe(C6H2(CH3)3)2pyridine2. The complex is prepared by treating ferrous halides with the Grignard reagent formed from mesityl bromide:
2 FeCl2 + 4 BrMgC6H2(CH3)3 → Fe2(C6H2(CH3)3)4 + 2 MgBrCl

References

Organoiron compounds